Manuel Cáceres Artesero (born 15 January 1949 in Ciudad Real, Spain), better known as Manolo, el del bombo (English: Manolo the Bass Drummer) is one of the most famous football fans in the world.

Biography
Raised in Huesca, he is Valencia CF and the Spain national football team's most famous supporter and has become a national institution. He is easily recognized by his large beret, red number 12 jersey and his famous bass drum, "El bombo de España" (The drum of Spain), which he bangs throughout matches.

Manolo first travelled abroad to watch Spain in 1979 and was present to all Spain's international matches since 1982. On 3 July 2010 he missed his first game: Spain - Paraguay at FIFA World Cup 2010 South Africa, because he caught pneumonia.

At the 1982 World Cup in Spain he hitch-hiked 15,800 kilometers in order to follow his team. He has also gone through 9 or 10 "bombos".

He owned the bar Tu Museo Deportivo next to the Estadio Mestalla that doubles as a sports museum. It was closed in 2011.

During the FIFA World Cup 2018 in Russia he was prohibited to be with his bass drum in the matches. He decided to not to travel abroad with "La Roja".

References

External links 

  

Association football supporters
1949 births
Living people
Valencia CF
Bass drum players
People from Ciudad Real
People from Huesca
People from Valencia